The village of Arghistan (also Arghestan or Arghastan) is the headquarters of Arghistan District in Kandahar Province of Afghanistan.

Arghistan Valley is where the famous Islamic scholar Dr. Muhammad Muhsin Khan's tribe (Al-Khoashki Al-Jamandi) live.

See also
Kandahar Province

References

External links

Populated places in Kandahar Province